Testican-2 is a protein that in humans is encoded by the SPOCK2 gene.

Function 

Proteoglycans, which consist of a core protein and covalently linked glycosaminoglycans, are components of the extracellular matrix. SPOCK2 encodes a member of a novel Ca(2+)-binding proteoglycan family.[supplied by OMIM]

References

Further reading 

 
 
 
 
 
 

Testicans